Cloud Lake is a town in Palm Beach County, Florida, United States. Cloud Lake has a population of 135 during the 2010 census. The town is situated adjacent to Glen Ridge and West Palm Beach and is located near the Palm Beach International Airport. Established in 1951, Cloud Lake was built largely by the efforts of twin brothers Karl and Kenyon Riddle, the former of whom served as the City Manager and Superintendent of Public Works of West Palm Beach in the 1920s.

History
Cloud Lake was incorporated in 1949. The name is derived from Chief Yaholoochee (The Cloud) of the Seminole Indians.

Geography

Cloud Lake is located at  (26.675043, –80.073351). The town is bounded by Glen Ridge to the west and the south, State Road 80 to the north, and Interstate 95 to the east.

Demographics

As of the census of 2010, there were 135 people, 59 households, and 31 families residing in the town.

The population density was 1,350 inhabitants per square mile (2,172.5/km2).

As of 2010 the racial makeup of the town was 94.1% White (of which 71.1% were Non-Hispanic Whites,) 5.9% African American. Hispanic or Latino of any race were 23% of the population.

As of 2000 there were 62 households, out of which 30.6% had children under the age of 18 living with them, 56.5% were married couples living together, 9.7% had a female householder with no husband present, and 30.6% were non-families. 25.8% of all households were made up of individuals, and 9.7% had someone living alone who was 65 years of age or older. The average household size was 2.69 and the average family size was 3.33.

As of 2000 in the town the population was spread out, with 25.7% under the age of 18, 7.2% from 18 to 24, 30.5% from 25 to 44, 27.5% from 45 to 64, and 9.0% who were 65 years of age or older. The median age was 38 years. For every 100 females, there were 85.6 males. For every 100 females age 18 and over, there were 82.4 males.

As of 2000 the median income for a household in the town was $55,625, and the median income for a family was $57,292. Males had a median income of $31,250 versus $30,833 for females. The per capita income for the town was $24,311. None of the population or families were below the poverty line.

As of 2000, English was the first language of 100% of its residents. It, along with Briny Breezes, Golf, and Jupiter Inlet Colony  were the only municipalities in Palm Beach county with all residents having the mother tongue of English.

References

External links
 A Facebook page for the Cloud Lake community
 A brief history of Cloud Lake
 The website for Cloud Lake at the Palm Beach County Convention and Visitors Bureau

Towns in Palm Beach County, Florida
Towns in Florida